Drofyne is a village in Nyzhniohirskyi Raion of Crimea.

Geography
Drofyne is located in the south of the district, in the steppe Crimea, near the border with the Bilohirsk Raion, the altitude is 62 m.

The neighboring village: Jastrebski 2.5 km to the West, Strepitosa to the south and Sady to the North-East. Distance to the district center is about 21 kilometer.

The closest railway station is Nyzhniohirsk (on line Dzhankoi — Feodosia).

There is one school in Drofyne.

History
The villages of Maly Matis and Bolshoy Matis appeared, apparently, in the 1930s, as in the List of settlements of the Crimean Autonomous Soviet Socialist Republic in the Soviet Union of 17 December 1926.

In the Statistical Handbook of Taurida province in 1915 Tabulinskiy parish Simferopol Raion featured a Russo-German farm, with a population of 36 people, including 8 Germans.

By the decree of the Presidium of USSR in RSFSR of 18 May 1948, Malyi Matis and Velykyi Matis Nyzhnohirskyi Raion were renamed in Drofyne. On 30 September 1966 the village became centre of the village Council.

References

External links
 Drofino on a map of Crimea

Villages in Crimea
Nyzhniohirskyi Raion